Karl Lukas, born Karol Louis Lukasiak (August 21, 1919 – January 16, 1995) was an American film and television actor. He was best known for playing Pvt. Stash Kadowski in The Phil Silvers Show.

Lukas guest-starred in numerous television programs including The Andy Griffith Show, Gunsmoke, Bonanza, The Rockford Files, The Dick Van Dyke Show, Rawhide, Wagon Train, The Beverly Hillbillies, Alfred Hitchcock Presents, The F.B.I., Petticoat Junction and The Monkees. He also appeared in a few episodes of Family Affair, Bewitched and Mister Ed. Lukas died in January 1995 of heart failure in Westlake Village, California, at the age of 75. He was buried in San Fernando Mission Cemetery.

Filmography

Film

Television

References

External links 

Rotten Tomatoes profile

1919 births
1995 deaths
People from Lowell, Massachusetts
American male television actors
American male film actors
20th-century American male actors
Burials at San Fernando Mission Cemetery